D.Gray-man is a Japanese manga series written and illustrated by Katsura Hoshino. Set in an alternate 19th century, it tells the story of a young Allen Walker, who joins an organization of exorcists named the Black Order. They use an ancient substance, Innocence, to combat a man known as the Millennium Earl and his demonic army of Akuma who intend to destroy humanity. Many characters are adapted from Hoshino's previous works and drafts, such as Zone. The series is noted for its dark narrative; Hoshino once rewrote a scene she thought too violent for her young readers.

The manga began serialization in 2004 in the Weekly Shōnen Jump magazine, published by Shueisha. Production of the series was suspended several times because of Hoshino's health problems. D.Gray-man made the transition from a weekly to a monthly series in November 2009, when it began serialization in Jump Square. In January 2013, the series went on indefinite hiatus. It resumed serialization in July 2015 after the release of Jump SQ.Crown, a spin-off from the magazine Jump SQ. After Jump SQ.Crown ceased its publication, the series was switched to Jump SQ.Rise, starting in April 2018. The manga's chapters have been collected in 28 tankōbon volumes as of October 2022. By July 2021, Viz Media had released 27 volumes in North America.

A spin-off novel series, D.Gray-man: Reverse by Kaya Kizaki, explores the history of a number of characters. The manga has been adapted into a 103-episode anime series by TMS Entertainment which aired from October 2006 to September 2008 in Japan and is licensed by Funimation in North America. A 13-episode sequel anime series, D.Gray-Man Hallow, also produced by TMS Entertainment. It aired in Japan from July to September 2016 as a sequel to the first D.Gray-man anime series. Several items of merchandise have been produced, including two video games about the series.

The manga has become one of Shueisha's bestsellers, with over 25 million copies sold. In Japan and North America, several individual volumes have appeared in weekly top-ten lists of bestselling manga. Although most reviewers found it similar to other shōnen manga, they compared its moments of originality and well-developed characters favorably to other series of the same demographic. Hoshino's artwork has received mostly positive reviews; most critics have commented that her characters are visually appealing and that the Gothic elements in her art are pleasant to look at. However, one critic of her artwork has said that Hoshino's fight sequences can be difficult to follow.

Synopsis

Setting
Set in an alternate 19th century, the story focuses on an organization of exorcists, named the Black Order, as they defend humanity against the Noah Family, reincarnations of Noah and his twelve apostles whom bear hatred towards humanity and God led by a man known as the Millennium Earl. The exorcists' main weapon against the Noah Family are sentient holy artifacts called Innocence. Innocence comes in a variety of forms, varying from everyday objects such as boots to grandfather clocks, to weapons such as swords and guns; regardless of their form, each Innocence possesses unique offensive and supportive abilities and will only work for the wielder of their choosing. Out of the 109 Innocence hidden and scattered throughout the world, one of them is the master Innocence; whichever side obtains this Innocence first will win the war. In contrast to the Innocence, the Noah Family's weapons are derived from a power source known as Dark Matter. Dark Matter grants the Noah superpowers, along with the ability to create and control demons.

Plot
The central character is Allen Walker, a new recruit to the Black Order who started training to control his Innocence after it destroyed the Akuma of his late guardian, Mana. The story begins in a villain of the week fashion, where Allen teams up with various members of the Black Order to search for Innocence while battling Noah's demons on the way. Later, Allen and his friends are ordered to track down exorcist General Cross Marian, Allen's missing teacher. Their search concludes with them stealing one of the Noah's transportation device, referred to as the Noah's Ark; this was made possible since Allen has been instilled the consciousness of Nea D. Campbell, the brother of Mana, and the exiled 14th member of the Noah Family, who the Earl wishes to have back. Cross reveals that Nea plans to use Allen as host upon reincarnating, effectively erasing Allen eventually. During the Third Exorcists insurrection story arc, Nea's consciousness begins superseding Allen's body. Now hunted by the Black Order, the Noah Family, and a humanoid Innocence called Apocryphos, Allen goes into hiding as he searches for a way to end Nea's resurrection. During his journey, he realises that his late guardian, Mana, alongside Nea, has a strong link to the Millennium Earl. He then decides to journey to the place where Mana and Nea grew up to learn the truth about them, and their connection to the Earl. Following his escape, Allen is tracked by the Black Order, Apocryphos and the Noah. When Apocryphos is distracted by the Noah, the Earl finds Allen who is possessed by Nea. During this encounter it is revealed that the current Earl is Mana D. Campbell, Nea's brother. Both were once the original Millennium Earl but were split and became enemies.

Production

After graduating from high school, Hoshino was unsure what job get: animating or writing manga. When drawing manga, Hoshino saw herself as a failure when trying to draw shōjo manga, series aimed towards young girls. As a result, she decided to focus on manga aimed towards male readers, shōnen manga. After sending a one-shot to Shueisha, response from the editorial was positive much to Hoshino's surprise. D.Gray-man originated from a one-shot that Hoshino developed during her youth, where she aspired to write the Earl as the main character of her own works. However, finding the character unsuitable for a manga magazine aimed at teenagers, she instead created Allen to be the protagonist. Hoshino sent a draft of D.Gray-man to Shueisha on a non-specified date. She had mixed feelings about writing the series, since she had been offered other jobs (such as developing video games). However, Shueisha liked the draft and the staff asked Hoshino to go ahead with the series in 2004 believing it would be popular. She had originally intended to write a story about zombies, but was discouraged by her editor T-shi and decided to abandon the idea during the third chapter. Asked about her inspiration for writing about the supernatural, Hoshino said that she feared the supernatural after seeing the 1973 film The Exorcist. Although the horror film frightened her, it also inspired the author to design the manga's Akuma. The area in the series known as Noah's Ark was based on science fiction ideas rather than the supernatural ideas that had influenced the Akuma. After conceiving of the Ark's role in the series, Hoshino decided to write a song when Allen is rebuilding it through a piano. She requested help from her editor, a university graduate, but decided to use her own lyrics. She blamed it on her own ego.

Elements of D.Gray-man first appeared in Hoshino's one-shot title Zone, in which the Akuma, the exorcists, and the Millennium Earl plan to end the world. Although Allen Walker is male, his character is based on Zone female protagonist. Lavi is based on the protagonist of Hoshino's planned series, Book-man, that she originally wanted to write. Other characters, such as the Millennium Earl, Lenalee Lee, and Komui Lee, are based on real people whom Hoshino has not specifically identified; some are well-known scientists, and Komui is based on Hoshino's boss. The character of Yu Kanda, based on a samurai, was created to vary D.Gray-mans Western setting. Hoshino found the design of some of the characters difficult early in the series. In 2011, the author visited New York City for research, and believed that the city had greatly influenced her work. Hoshino visited cemeteries, and was deeply impressed by her guides' comments at Ground Zero of the World Trade Center (left after the September 11 attacks). She said that she would like to spend more time in New York City to gather data for the series.

After beginning D.Gray-man, Hoshino considered continuing to use the name Zone and also contemplated naming the series Dolls or Black Noah. She chose "D.Gray-man" for its several meanings, most referring to the state of Allen and the other main characters. Although the title's meaning was not completely explained, Hoshino said that the "D" stands for "dear". According to the author, she got most of her ideas for the series while sleeping in her bathtub for six hours. One exception was the second-volume plot, based on a Noh story entitled "Koi no Omoni".

When the manga moved from weekly to monthly serialization in 2009, Hoshino heard concerns from readers about its possible cancellation and reassured them that the series would continue. She set up Kanda's backstory by introducing the Third Exorcists, characters related to him and Alma Karma. In Hoshino's original drafts, Kanda's past had a number of plot holes. A rewritten, published version had a young Kanda walking along a path surrounded by dead people who had cared for him. Due to its violence, the image was replaced with one in which Kanda learns that Alma Karma had killed them all. When the chapters were collected into a volume, Hoshino added a small chapter which included the corpses.

Writing
At the time of drawing, Hoshino often finds herself rewriting sketches to the point the final images does not match her original ideas. When writing titles, Hoshino attempts to think of something bright in order to contrast the series' dark narrative. Fellow writer Takeshi Obata claimed that Hoshino's art continues to improve the more she writes but she replied to him that she is not aware of her own change. Due to the intense development of the storyline, Hoshino believes she can no longer write simple eyes. When drawing the series, Hoshino entrusts her storyboards to her editor, which was initially complicated to her due to D.Gray-man being her first series. She faced difficulties with the initial weekly serialization of the manga resulted in multiple changes due to how the storyboards changed across this period. Following Hoshino's change to a three-mestral serialization, she uses digital from the storyboard stage. In bringing this style, she looked after manga author Tite Kubo, famous for writing Bleach, who uses a similar style. This allowed her to add more details to her illustrations and made the faces of her characters more unique.  Including Hoshino, there are three people working in the manga, but at times the number increases for the last spurt. Since moving to a trimestral magazine, the author has some leeway with time, so her assistants stay at their homes and work from there with what Hoshino send them. However, Hoshino expressed regrets of this idea of working as it often causes misunderstandings. In the making of fights scenes, Hoshino has claimed in an interview that she lacks the ability to properly draw them. However, manga author Osamu Akimoto has praised some of her compositions such as the handling of Lenalee Lee before Noah's Ark, or the handling of Jasdevi's guns.

Characters
When designing the characters, Hoshino first imagines their lives even though some parts might not be featured in the story. Their personalities are then written down along with their habits or eating preferences. She has admitted she does not have written details about a number of D.Gray-man characters. In designing the Earl, Hoshino gave him a colorful look to contrast the exorcists' who wore black instead. This look was meant to give the idea of a gentleman related with the tragedy he causes as Hoshino linked him to a poisonous flower. In designing the Black Order exorcist, Hoshino feels that their first uniforms were easy to draw so she like them. The second uniforms were brought the artist problems due to the idea of giving each the clothing zippers. For the third uniforms, the color remained black but Hoshino decided to them red too as a reference to blood because she thought such grotesque looks would fit the themes of D.Gray-man. In other early colored chapters, Hoshino experimented with giving Allen gothic lolita style clothing and color style referencing American comics. Other early colored illustrations were meant to give the idea of symbolism such Kanda's being seen as a puppet or Allen being covered by threads of Akuma and later the idea of his Innocence returning to his body, giving him a shocked appearance.

The author noted that the character of Lavi was popular with fans, placing third in a poll (behind Allen and Kanda) despite infrequent appearances in later story arcs, and she promised that Lavi would return. The story arc involving Alma Karma, featuring several characters, was difficult for the author; as a result, the next arc in which Allen leaves the Black Order contained fewer characters per chapter due to its different format. The character of Apocryphos was introduced to hint at the Heart, a plot element briefly described in a past storyline which would later reappear. Due to Jump Square (the manga's magazine at the time) readership, which consisted of older men rather than children, Hoshino found Allen the most difficult character to write. She does not want Allen's problems in recent story arcs to lead to portraying him as a troubled teenager, preferring to show him as a cheerful person with a balance of strength and sorrow. After D.Gray-man dark narrative, Hoshino plans to write more lighthearted series in the future.

Themes
According to Hoshino, the series' main theme focuses on tragedy. Many characters such as Allen across the series suffer poor fates such as losing a loved one and being tempted to revive them by the Earl. Although this works, the people are revived as Akuma who consume the skin of their loved ones. This has led to her to state that an initial theme is that people should not be brought back to life. Although some characters like Kanda express unconditional love to Alma, their happiness is short-lived due to Alma dying shortly after this with another writer finding fitting for the series' dark narrative. Additionally, Allen's life becomes sadder across the series as he is forced to abandon the Black Order due to the Pope removing his rights as an exorcist and he is treated as Noah due to his connections with these characters. Nevertheless, Hoshino still tried to make it fun for the readers, stating that Allen will always have allies.

Another common theme of the series is the lack of black and white morality. Although Allen initially starts as a hero in the Black Order, their group are revealed to have created actions that might question the readers' thoughts in regards to whether or not the Order is good. Additionally, the Noah clan starts showing hidden depths despite their evil nature with the antagonistic Earl showing his care for the Noah Nea D. Campbell while Tyki Mikk questions Allen about whether or not the Exorcist should return to his "home" due to the way he has been treated as a result of being the Nea's vessel.

In the book Representing Multiculturalism in Comics and Graphic Novels Jacob Birken states another theme set in the series is identity. This is reflected in Allen and the exorcists familiarizing themselves with their own supernatural powers in order to become more humanize themselves. On the other hand, Allen's revelation that he is the 14th Noah which makes him less human. Another theme is grief, as seen in the Millennium Earl's appearance as a tired, middle-aged man who is constantly searching for a former comrade, Nea. Hoshino believes that the Millennium Earl, the series' main antagonist, would fit the manga's demographic. In the book Anime and Philosophy: Wide Eyed Wonder Josef Steiff and Tristan D. Tamplin discuss how D.Gray-man, alongside Spriggan and Ulysses 31, focus on the "end of the world" with D.Gray-man and Spriggan taking references from the blibical flood.

Hoshino's illustration involving Allen often have threads related covered with threads as she aims to show the fact that he is not only related to the fact that he is always associated with God as well as the fact that he is bound to exorcise Akumas. Similarly, Kanda was first illustrated in color pages with multiple threads in a symbolic way to say he is a puppet as the person he has been searching for his entire life but has been unable to reach his objective.

Adaptation

During production of the first anime adaptation, the author often visited the TMS Entertainment studio, where the voice actors requested advice about their characters. Although Hoshino was nervous about talking with them, she was surprised by their dedication in practising their characters—particularly Sanae Kobayashi (Allen), Takahiro Sakurai (Kanda), Katsuyuki Konishi (Komui), and Hiroki Tōchi (Cross Marian)—and joked that Lenalee seemed more beautiful after she saw Shizuka Itō's work. Early in production, Hoshino was shown an early version of the first opening theme: "Innocent Sorrow" by the Japanese rock band Abingdon Boys School. When she saw the video, Hoshino began to cry in delight while the staff laughed to her. Tyki Mikk's voice actor, Toshiyuki Morikawa, remembered the recording sessions for the series as "lively" because of the presence of many popular actors. After the anime finished, the actors (who became friends during production) kept in touch.

The anime's sequel was subtitled Hallow, referring to Halloween; the holiday celebrates the "revival of the dead", and TMS Entertainment celebrated the "revival of the D.Gray-man anime series". Although it is a sequel, Hoshino called it a completely new D.Gray-man anime and thanked fans for following it. The original Japanese actors were replaced, with Ayumu Murase voicing Allen and Shinnosuke Tachibana voicing Howard Link; both anime adaptations retained most of Funimation's English-language cast. In the English version, Allen was voiced by Todd Haberkorn, who said that voicing the character was a career highlight.

Media

Manga

Written and drawn by Hoshino, the D.Gray-man manga began its serialization in Shueisha's shōnen manga magazine Weekly Shōnen Jump on May 31, 2004. The series went on hiatus several times due to issues with Hoshino's health. Publication resumed on March 9, 2009. The series' 186th and last chapter in the magazine was published on April 27, 2009. The series reappeared in the seasonal magazine Akamaru Jump on August 17. After its run in Akamaru Jump, D.Gray-Man resumed publication in the monthly magazine Jump SQ, where it ran from November 4, 2009, to January 4, 2013. After an over two-year hiatus, the series was transferred to the quarterly Jump SQ.Crown, running from July 17, 2015, to January 19, 2018, when the magazine ceased its publication. The manga moved to the then brand-new quarterly magazine Jump SQ.Rise on April 16, 2018.

Individual chapters have been published in tankōbon format by Shueisha. The first volume features Allen Walker and the Millennium Earl together. In original revisions of such cover, both were drawn from the back but the editorial demanded Hoshino to make Allen more visible as he is the main character. The first volume was published on October 9, 2004, and the 28th volume was published on October 4, 2022. In the making of each volume, Hoshino originally wanted each cover to be focused on a single character. However, following the 9th compilation of the series, Hoshino changed her mind and instead decided to try different types of covers that feature multiple characters.

At the 2005 San Diego Comic-Con International, D.Gray-man was licensed for English-language publication in North America by Viz Media. The company published the first collected volume of the series on May 2, 2006. The 27th volume was released on July 6, 2021. Viz Media reissued the series in a 3-in-1 format, publishing eight 3-volumes-in-1 editions from July 2, 2013, to November 3, 2015. Madman Entertainment published the Viz's 27-volume English edition in Australia and New Zealand, from August 10, 2008, November 15, 2021.

Anime

In June 2006, Shueisha announced that the D.Gray-man manga would be adapted as an anime. Its first episodes were directed by Osamu Nabeshima and produced by Dentsu, TMS Entertainment, Aniplex, and TV Tokyo. TMS Entertainment provided the animation, while Aniplex provided the music. The series began airing on October 3, 2006 on TV Tokyo. The anime's 51-episode first season, known as the "1st stage", ended on September 25, 2007. The 52-episode second season, known as the "2nd stage", began on October 2, 2007 and ended on September 30, 2008, for a total of 103 episodes. The anime adapts the manga's storyline from the beginning and concludes after the destruction of the Black Order headquarters. The episodes were released by Aniplex on 26 DVDs from February 7, 2007 to March 4, 2009.

The English-language versions of the first 51 episodes was licensed by Funimation in May 2008, and released in North America on DVD from March 31, 2009 to January 5, 2010. The anime made its North American television debut on the Funimation Channel in September 2010. The first 51 episodes were released on four DVDs by Madman Entertainment from August 19, 2009 to May 13, 2010, and a DVD box set was released on June 6, 2012. In the United Kingdom, Manga Entertainment released the first season in four parts from February 22 to October 18, 2010. A box set was released on December 6, 2010. On June 30, 2016, it was announced that Funimation had acquired the rights to the anime's second season. In August 2017, Funimation announced they would release the series' second half on home media version starting on October of the same year. In August, Crunchyroll started streaming the first 25 episodes of the series.

A second TV anime series was announced at Shueisha's 2016 Jump Festa. Hoshino called the new series a sequel of the first anime, rather than a reboot. It starts where the first series finished and ends with Allen's departure from the Order. The new series, D.Gray-man Hallow, directed by Yoshiharu Ashino and written by Michiko Yokote, Tatsuto Higuchi, and Kenichi Yamashita, has character designs by Yosuke Kabashima and music by Kaoru Wada. Crunchyroll would stream the series as it aired in Japan. It aired on TV Tokyo from July 4 to September 26, 2016, and was broadcast on Animax Asia. Hallow home-media release was delayed, and in March 2017, the official D.Gray-man Hallow website stated the home-media release was cancelled due to "various circumstances".

Soundtracks
The music for the D.Gray-man anime series was composed by Kaoru Wada, and four CD soundtracks have been released in Japan by Sony Music Entertainment. The first, 34-track D.Gray-man Original Soundtrack 1 (including its first opening theme and the first two ending themes), was released on March 21, 2007.  It was followed by the 32-track CD D.Gray-man Original Soundtrack 2, released on December 19, 2007, which includes the series' second opening theme and its third and fourth closing themes. The series' opening and closing themes were collected on a CD, D.Gray-man Complete Best, which was released on September 24, 2008. Its limited edition includes a DVD with credit-less footage of the series' introduction and closing scenes and anime illustrations.

The third soundtrack, D.Gray-man Original Soundtrack 3 with 31 tracks, was released in Japan on December 17, 2008. It includes the series' third and fourth opening themes, the fifth to eighth closing themes and the insert song  by Sanae Kobayashi (Allen Walker's first Japanese voice actor). Another soundtrack, based on the Hallow sequel, was released on September 28, 2016. Entitled D.Gray-man Hallow Original Soundtrack, the release includes 40 tracks.

Video games
Two D.Gray-man adventure games, based on the first anime series, have been released. The first,  for Nintendo DS, was released in Japan by Konami on March 29, 2007 with Allen and his comrades as playable characters. The second, was released for PlayStation 2 on September 11, 2008. In it, Allen trains in the Asian headquarters of the Black Order to regain powers lost after a previous battle so he can rejoin his allies to fight the Akuma and Noah. Allen and other series characters appear in the Nintendo DS fighting game Jump Super Stars and its sequel, Jump Ultimate Stars, and he is a supporting character in the fighting game J-Stars Victory VS.

Books
A three-volume light novel based on the manga series, D.Gray-man: Reverse by Kaya Kizaki, was published by Shueisha. The first volume, published on May 30, 2005, focuses on Allen's journey to the Black Order after he finishes his exorcism training, Yu Kanda's mission to find a witch, and Asian branch head Bak Chan, who tries to learn how Komui Lee was elected European branch head (instead of himself). The second volume, published on July 4, 2006, is set in the Black Order. Allen and other characters attend a party, Lavi trains to be the next Bookman before he meets Allen, and the Millennium Earl searches for people to create Akuma. The third volume was published on December 3, 2010. Its first chapter follows Black Order scientist Rohfa's search for Allen, with whom she is infatuated. In the second chapter, Allen lives with a circus as a child after he is abandoned by his parents.

Several other series-related books also exist published by Shueisha. The D.Gray-man Official Fanbook: Gray Ark was published on June 4, 2008, and TV Animation D.Gray-man Official Visual Collection: Clown Art on September 4. Three omnibus editions were published on November 13 and December 11, 2009 and January 15, 2010. They were followed by an illustrated book, D.Gray-man Illustrations Noche, on February 4, 2010. Noche was published by Viz Media on December 6, 2011. The artist's book also contains two interviews with Hoshino and manga artists Osamu Akimoto and Takeshi Obata. D.Gray-man Character Ranking Book, a compilation of character popularity polls with character profiles by Hoshino and the one-shot , was published on July 4, 2011. A new book, D.Gray-man Official Fan Book - Gray Log (Gray's Memory), was released in Japan on August 4, 2017.

Reception

Popularity

The manga has been popular in Japan. One of Weekly Shōnen Jump bestselling series, individual volumes have appeared on annual Japanese top-50 manga sales lists; in 2008, volumes 14, 15, and 16 were on the list. Later volumes were also Japanese bestsellers. In August 2020, the series had a Japanese circulation of over 25 million copies. Manga author Katsura Hoshino is grateful to the editors assisting her to the point of saying that she owes the series' success to them.

Volumes of Viz's English version of the series have appeared on bestselling manga lists in the New York Times and Nielsen BookScan. In its summer 2008 and Q3 2008 lists, ICv2 ranked D.Gray-man the 15th-bestselling manga property in North America. In 2009 and 2010, the series was North America's bestselling shōnen property and the bestselling manga overall. It was ranked as the 24th and 23rd North American manga property on ICv2 Top 25 Manga list in 2011 and 2012, respectively.

Zassosha's manga magazine, Puff, ranked the series the seventh-best long-story manga of 2006. In France, it received the Best Manga Series of 2006 award at the Anime and Manga 2007 French Grand Prix (organized by Animeland) and the 2006 Manga of the Year award from Webotaku. The anime DVDs have also been popular, ranking high on several Japanese animation DVD lists from 2007 to 2009, and the series was listed as a most-watched anime of the week. Its novelizations were also well-received; the second volume was the third-bestselling novel in Japan in 2006. D.Gray-man characters have also inspired cosplay. On TV Asahi's Manga Sōsenkyo 2021 poll, in which 150.000 people voted for their top 100 manga series, D.Gray-man ranked #95.

Critical reception

Manga
Reception of the series has been generally positive. In his review of volume one, Carlo Santos of Anime News Network said that certain plot points "come out of nowhere" and the story was kept from its full potential due to finding some points like the designs generic. However, he enjoyed the series' quick-moving plot, exposition, and backstory. Sheena McNeil from Sequentialtart called it the best manga from 2006 based on its story and cast. A.E. Sparrow of IGN also reviewed the first volume, comparing the series' antagonist to three of Batmans villains due to his likeability despite his role. Sparrow also enjoyed Allen's characterization based on his tragic backstory. Calling the early volumes an "amateur comic", reviewer Leroy Douresseaux of Coolstreak Cartoons noted that the plot and art improved significantly with each volume, whereas Otaku USA was amazed by the amount of its different mixed elements, stating that it is "part shonen, part fantasy, part horror, part mythology, part action, part comedy, part really warped comedy, part goth, part historical, part alternative history," concluding that although these elements are typical of manga, the series "remains so different." Ross Liversidge of the UK Anime Network enjoyed the first three volumes; Hoshino had "an excellent quality of storytelling" in juggling dark plot, light comedy and appealing characters. According to Brian Henson of Mania Beyond Entertainment, the series became better over time; although some elements seemed derivative, it developed a unique identity. Yussif Osman of Japanator said that the characters were some of the deepest seen in shōnen manga, citing Lavi's backstory and the Noah Family.

Later volumes were also praised; Otaku USAs Joseph Luster appreciated the series' battles and Allen's development. The revelation that Allen would be an enemy of the Order and the 14th Noah was well received by Grant Goodman of Pop Culture Shock and Chris Beveridge of the Fandom Post. However, Goodman criticized early-volume reliance on comedy rather than plot. Beveridge and Erkael of Manga News were impressed with Kanda's dark past. Douresseaux liked Allen's situation in volume 21 (due to the character's connections with the Noah), and wanted to see more of that and less of Kanda's fight with Alma Karma. Chris Kirby of the Fandom Post felt the constant mysteries across the series were entertaining, but lamented the continuous hiatus Hoshino had to take, leaving multiple fans disappointed in regards to future story events.

Hoshino's art received mixed reviews. According to Casey Brienza of ANN, as of volume twelve, the battles were "practically unintelligible" yet liked the rest of the artwork. She described Hoshino's drawing style as the "aesthetic yet dynamic, superbly beautiful yet super-violent" style made famous by female manga artists arising from the late-1980s and early-1990s dōjinshi subculture, citing Clamp and Yun Kōga as examples. Brienza also talked about Hoshino's character designs, believing fans of both sexes would find them appealing. Douresseaux called Hoshino's art "highly stylish" and reminiscent of work by Joe Madureira, Kelley Jones, and Chris Bachalo. Describing her backgrounds as eerie and Lovecraftian, Douresseaux wrote that Hoshino made appealing scenes that combined both gothic and violent elements. Brian Henson criticized changes made to the Viz Media version, such as the replacement of Japanese sound effects with less-appealing ones and awkward translations of character names.

Anime

According to Funimation Entertainment president and CEO Gen Fukunaga, the anime series was popular in Japan and the United States. Carl Kimlinger of Anime News Network reviewed the first episode, calling it derivative with "absolutely nothing original" but not boring. Noting that Allen's use of the anti-Akuma weapon might seem clichéd, Todd Douglass Jr. of DVD Talk found its use in the anime entertaining. Active Anime's Sandra Scholes and UK Anime Network's Kevin Leathers enjoyed the anime series and, similarly to Douglass, found its small borrowings from other series appealing. Both reviewers praised Allen Walker's characterization. Anime Insider Kimberly Morales said that the series' animation quality varied and although the story was appealing, voice actor Travis Willingham was miscast as Kanda. However, Morales liked the series and its cast overall. Tom Tonhat of The Escapist praised the cast due to how it inspired multiple cosplaying and noted the impact of the Earl's characterization as it involved about how the dead cannot be brought back to life.

UK Anime's Kevin Leathers criticized its lack of entertaining story arcs, and Anime News Network's Casey Brienza called the anime a poor adaptation of the manga. On the other hand, Neo enjoyed the direction of the episodes even though some are called "filler" based on how they allow to focus on the large cast. Allen's English-language voice actor, Todd Haberkorn, said that anime sales were poor despite generally-positive reviews; he suggested that fans buy DVDs on sale to keep the series from being cancelled.

The anime's sequel, D.Gray-man Hallow, was one of the most-anticipated anime series of summer 2016 by followers of Anime News Network and the Japanese web portal goo. Since he had not watched the original anime for some time, Alex Osborn of IGN appreciated the brief exposition in the sequel's first episode to remind the audience of the plot. Although he enjoyed the interaction among the main cast, Osborn was confused by the revelation that Allen would become the 14th Noah and had to watch the scene again in order to understand it. In a later review, Osborn said he was amazed by Allen's first possession by the 14th Noah; although it was "disturbing", it enhanced the character's development. Anne Laurenroth remarked Kanda's character development in Hallow, particularly his fight against Alma Karma and his return to the Order in the finale. Laurenroth noted Hallow poor animation and pacing but, although most of its episodes were grim, its final moments were upbeat. Manga Tokyo appreciated the black and white morality of the story when Allen is imprisoned by the Order he was working for and has to rely on the Millennium Earl's comrades in order to survive. However, the reviewer felt that viewers needed more information than what the story was able to provide.

References

External links

 
 
 
 

 
2004 manga
2006 anime television series debuts
2016 anime television series debuts
Adventure anime and manga
Alternate history manga
Anime series based on manga
Aniplex
Dark fantasy anime and manga
Exorcism in anime and manga
Funimation
Jump J-Books
Odex
Science fantasy anime and manga
Shōnen manga
Shueisha franchises
Shueisha manga
TMS Entertainment
TV Tokyo original programming
Viz Media manga